Treasure Hunters is a vintage car attraction in Ancient Egypt area of Universal Studios Singapore. The attraction opened on March 18, 2010, with the rest of the park. The attraction is ideal for guests of all ages. Children under  in height must be accompanied by a supervising companion. The ride takes guests on a slow tour of an abandoned excavation site. Animatronic animals within the attraction include some hippos, some vultures, many cobras, a cheetah, and some Nile crocodiles.

Gallery

References

External links
 

Universal Studios Singapore
Universal Parks & Resorts attractions by name
Amusement rides introduced in 2010
Animatronic attractions
2010 establishments in Singapore